Houcine Dimassi (born 18 November 1948) is a Tunisian politician. He served as the Minister of Finance under Prime Minister Hamadi Jebali.

Biography

Early life
Houcine Dimassi was born on 18 November 1948 in Ksar Hellal. He received a PhD in Economics in 1983 and the agrégation in 1984.

Career
He started his career as a university professor of Economics at the University of Tunis. From 1988 to 1991, he served as Dean at the University of Sousse. He has attended conferences of the World Bank, the Food and Agriculture Organization, and the United Nations Development Programme. In 2001, he wrote a report for the Tunisian General Labour Union.

Minister
On 20 December 2011, after the deposal of President Ben Ali, he joined the Jebali Cabinet as Minister of Finance and submitted his resignation, which was accepted, on 27 July 2012.

Personal life
He is married and has four children.

References

Living people
1948 births
Finance ministers of Tunisia
Government ministers of Tunisia
Academic staff of Tunis University
Academic staff of the University of Sousse